McElbert Moore (July 2, 1892 – April 10, 1972) was an American playwright, screenwriter, and lyricist.

Born Elbert Francis Moore in Boston, he attended Waltham High School. He worked as a drama critic and editor at local newspapers. He was part of the Harvard College class of 1916 and was a pilot candidate in the Army before working on the Amry's theatrical productions.

He wrote several plays in the 1920s. He co-wrote screenplays for several films in the 1940s.

As a lyricist, he worked with Anton Lada and J. Fred Coots.

He married actress Margaret Moore. They wrote the song "Don't Take My Balloon".

Filmography
Ever Since Venus (1944), co-writer with Arthur Dreifuss
An Old Fashioned Girl (1949)
Shamrock Hill (1949), co-writer with Arthur Hoerl
There's a Girl in My Heart (1949), co-writer with Arthur Hoerl

Discography
"Back Numbers in My Little Red Book" (1922), lyrics, music by J. Fred Coots
"Only One" (1953), from Matinee Girl
"Like-a-Me, Like-a-You, from Matinee Girl
"When" (1953), from A Night in Paris (1926)
"Why Should We Be Wasting Time?" from A Night in Paris, lrics
"Fascinating Lady" from A Night in Paris, lrics

Theater
The Eclipse (1922)
Spice of 1922 (1922), lyrics
Dew Drop Inn (1923)
Plain Jane (1924)The Matinee Girl (1926)A Night in Paris (1926)Happy (1927)Zeppelin (1929)Hanky PankyThe Bal Tabarin (1923)Innocent EyesHello EverybodySittin PrettyAccidentally YoursLeave it to MeJunetime''

References

External link

1892 births
1972 deaths
American male dramatists and playwrights
20th-century American dramatists and playwrights
Writers from Boston
20th-century American male writers
Editors of Massachusetts newspapers
American lyricists
American male screenwriters
American male journalists
Harvard College alumni
United States Army personnel
20th-century American male musicians
20th-century American journalists
Screenwriters from Massachusetts
Waltham High School alumni
20th-century American screenwriters